Green Mountain Community Network (GMCN)  is a private, nonprofit organization, that owns and operates the public transit system by local bus in Bennington County in southwestern Vermont called the Green Mountain Express. Their bus service currently has 3 local "fixed deviated" weekday routes in Bennington: the Red, Blue and Brown routes, which can deviate up to 1/4 mile from their alignment upon request. They also have two local Saturday (Green and Light Green) routes, and three commuter routes: the Orange Line, with weekday plus Saturday service to Manchester; the Purple Line, with weekday service to Williamstown, Massachusetts; and the Emerald line, with weekday service to Wilmington. The Emerald Line is a partnership between West Dover-based Southeast Vermont Transit's "the MOOver" and GMCN.

The company also provides paratransit and Medicaid transportation services for Bennington County. 

GMCN had an annual ridership of approximately 64,900 in fiscal year 2010, the second fewest of any public bus transit provider in Vermont for that time period when not including the Brattleboro BeeLine (now fully operated by the Current). They now have an annual ridership of about 135,000. There are 22 wheelchair accessible vehicles in GMCN's fleet. Their management headquarters, bus garage and transit hub are located at 215 Pleasant Street in Bennington.

History
Prior to February 2007 and dating back to 1985, the Green Mountain Chapter of the American Red Cross filled the role of providing the Bennington area's public transportation needs.

On July 9, 2012, GMCN added the Emerald Line to their schedule with weekday service to Wilmington, along with the opening of the renovated Pleasant St office building as their transit center. And as of March 18, 2019, the Yankee Trails Bennington shuttle and Vermont Translines' Albany to Burlington and Shires Connector intercity bus routes use the transit center as their main Bennington stops as well.

As of January 19, 2015, trip planning via Google Maps is also available for GMCN bus routes. And as of November 10, 2019, live bus tracking is available on the Transit mobile application for Android and Apple devices.

In March 2020, GMCN became one of the first public transit agencies in Vermont to go fare free because of the COVID-19 pandemic.

Route list and fare schedule
(information is current as of November 2019)

Red Line (30 minute loop, $0.50)
Blue Line (30 minute loop, $0.50)
Brown Line (bidirectional line between Bennington College and the east end of town, Southern Vermont College and Old Bennington service has been terminated as of November 2019, $0.50)
Orange Line (bidirectional commuter line between Bennington and Manchester, $0.50-$2.00)
Purple Line (bidirectional commuter line between Bennington and Williamstown, Massachusetts, $0.50-$1.00)
Emerald Line (evening bidirectional commuter line between Bennington and Wilmington, morning service provided by Southeast Vermont Transit's "MOOver" 13 route, fare free)
Green Line-North (Saturday loop, fare free)
Green Line-South (Saturday loop, fare free)

Children under 5 years of age ride free upon boarding with a paying adult, as do Mount Anthony Union High School, Burr & Burton, Bennington College, CCV, and Northeast Baptist College students. All local one-way fares are $0.50 unless indicated otherwise. Slightly discounted 10-ride, 22-ride, and 44-ride passes are also available for local routes. Bus passes for the Orange Line between Bennington and Manchester are also available, and fares vary on the Orange and Purple routes, depending on the boarding passenger's origin and destination. As the Orange Line and Purple Lines are out-of-town commuter routes with a zone-based fare structure, travel between one or two towns (one zone) is $0.50, with an additional $0.50 tacked on to each additional town passed through. The local passes mentioned above may also be used on those routes. One ride is deducted from such passes per zone traveled on these two routes.

As of November 2019, there is no discount fare schedule for seniors, the disabled or Medicare cardholders on fixed deviated routes. However, United Counseling Service CRT clients and Vermont Medicaid cardholders qualify for one free local 10-ride pass per week.

Transfers
Bus-to-bus transfers are available as well between the three local routes (the Red, Blue and Brown Lines), but are not valid for round trips or when traveling northbound from Bennington on the Orange Line when traveling beyond Shaftsbury or southbound from Bennington on the Purple Line beyond Pownal.

Bus passes
$4 per 10-ride pass on local routes
$10 per 22-ride pass on local routes
$20 per 44-ride pass on local routes
$60 per 40-ride pass on Orange Line between Bennington and Manchester

References

External links
 GMCN website

Bus transportation in Vermont
Bennington, Vermont